From 4 October 2018 to early November, heavy floods affected Europe. The floods started in the Italian region of Calabria. Then, on 9 October, the island of Mallorca, Spain was struck by floods and in the next days some cities in Southwest France, the region of Sardinia, Italy and some parts of Portugal and the United Kingdom were also struck by flash floods. At the end of the month, Italy was struck again by heavy floods and strong winds. A total of 69 people were killed: 36 in Italy, 16 in France, 13 in Spain, 2 in the United Kingdom and 2 in Portugal.

Flooded countries

See also

 Hurricane Leslie (2018)
 Autumn 2000 western Europe floods
 2007 United Kingdom floods
 2009 European floods
 2009 Messina floods and mudslides
 2009 Turkish flash floods
 2010 Central European floods
 2010 Var floods
 2011 European floods
 2012 Krasnodar Krai floods
 2013 European floods
 2014 Southeast Europe floods
 2014 Bulgarian floods
 2016 European floods
 2016 Macedonian floods

References

European floods
Floods in France
Floods in Italy
Floods in Spain
October 2018 events in France
October 2018 events in Italy
October 2018 events in Spain
Floods in the United Kingdom
Floods in Portugal
October 2018 events in the United Kingdom
2018 in Portugal